Ilha (Portuguese for "island") may refer to the following places in Portugal or Mozambique:

Ilha (Santana), a parish in the municipality of Santana, Madeira
Ilha (Pombal), a former parish in the municipality of Pombal 
Island of Mozambique, an island and populated place of the coast of mainland Mozambique